FC Kremin Kremenchuk is a Ukrainian sports club. This article contains historical and current statistics and records pertaining to the club.

Recent seasons

Statistics in Ukrainian Premier League
Seasons in Premier League: 6 
Best position in Premier League: 9 (2 times) 
Worst position in Premier League: 15 (2 times) 
Longest consecutive wins in Premier League: 14 (2005–06)
Longest unbeaten run in League matches:  
Longest unbeaten run at home in league matches:   matches
Longest winning run in the League (home):   matches
Longest scoring run in the League:   matches
Longest scoring run in the League (home):   matches
Most goals scored in a season: 46 (1995–96) 
Most goals scored in a match: Kremin 6 - Karpaty 1 (1949–50)
Most goals conceded in a match: Bukovyna 6 - Kremin 0 (11 October 1992)
Most wins in a league season: 14 (1995–96)
Most draws in a league season: 11 (1992–93) 
Most defeats in a league season: 20 (1996–97) 
Fewest wins in a league season: 4 (1992) 
Fewest draws in a league season: 3 (1996–97) 
Fewest defeats in a league season: 6 (1992)
Most Point Before Winter Break:  points
Historical classification of Premier League: 19

Players

Internationals
 First international for Ukraine: Ihor Zhabchenko against Belarus (28 October 1992)
 Other international players for Turkmenistan: Yuri Magdiýew and Muslim Agaýew
 Most international caps as a Kremin player: 1 - Ihor Zhabchenko - Ukraine

References

Statistics